William Thomas "Bill" Compton is a fictional character from The Southern Vampire Mysteries series by author Charlaine Harris. He is a vampire and is introduced in the first novel in the series, Dead Until Dark, and has appeared in all of the novels since. In the fifth season of the television adaptation, Bill plays the role of the main antagonist.

Human life
In the book series, Bill was born on April 9, 1840.  He lived in Bon Temps, Louisiana, and fought for the South during the Civil War. He was a married farmer with three children, although he states that he had five living children with his wife in Dead Until Dark. In 1865, he was made a vampire by Lorena, with whom he had a long and stormy relationship. Later in the book series, Bill discovers that he is related to the Bellefleur family in Bon Temps and secretly provides them with funds to aid in the repair of their ancestral home. The Bellefleurs - who do not know he is the source of the income - initially warm to him before coming to dislike him, but he is still able to assist Portia Bellefleur during her murder investigation in Living Dead in Dallas.

In Living Dead in Dallas Bill's middle name is given as Thomas, rather than Erasmus.

Prior to becoming a vampire, Bill was a tax accountant, where he was noted for being an exceptional worker.

Work and position within vampire hierarchy
At the end of the first novel, Dead Until Dark, Bill is concerned about the power of Area Five sheriff Eric over him and Sookie.  He decides to apply for that area's investigator position, and he gets it. It was revealed that Bill works for Queen Sophie-Anne and she has sent him to Bon Temps to investigate Sookie Stackhouse's telepathic abilities.

Bill is also the creator of a valuable database in which all the vampires in North America are listed along with their significant information. Vampires from other areas of the world, such as Peru, have also provided information for this database. The database itself has been controversial because of potential security issues and is only available for purchase to other vampires. While most older vampires have good memories, Bill's ability to recall precise details, faces and conversations is reputed to be exceptional, even among other long-lived supernaturals.

Romantic relationships
 Sookie Stackhouse
In the first book, Dead Until Dark, Bill has returned to his ancestral home in Bon Temps, which is separated from the Stackhouse home by the Bon Temps cemetery.  After briefly meeting Sookie at her place of work, Merlotte's bar, Sookie saves Bill from being "drained" by the Rattrays, a husband and wife who sell vampire blood for profit. Bill later saves Sookie by giving her his blood when the Rattrays seek revenge. They subsequently embark on Sookie's first serious romantic relationship. Sookie has to endure a fair amount of dislike from the Bon Temps locals.

Sookie and Bill's relationship falls apart when Bill is called back to his maker, Lorena, who entraps him in Mississippi to gain control of a project on which Bill is working for Sophie-Anne.  Their relationship ends, and is dealt a further and final blow in Definitely Dead when Eric discovers and immediately discloses to Sookie that Bill came to Bon Temps on a mission to secure her telepathic abilities for use by Louisiana's vampire Queen.

Bill continues to appear in the novels, but his relationship with Sookie is not romantic in nature, and by the events of Dead Reckoning he has become a trusted friend.

 Lorena Ball
In the third book, Club Dead, Lorena is introduced as Bill's maker and sire.  They were lovers since Bill became a vampire and they had an intense relationship.  They broke up eighty years ago.  In this novel, Bill tells Sookie that he had gone to Jackson because Lorena had called him, and he was obeying her summons. Before leaving, he tells Sookie that if he has not returned or been heard from in eight weeks, she should go to Eric and place herself under his protection. According to Bill, Lorena ordered him to leave Sookie and threatened to kill her.  While Bill is with Lorena, it is revealed by Eric and Pam that he had contacted them and told them he was leaving Sookie and he wanted to make financial arrangements for her care.

 Salome
Salome is mentioned in the book Dead as a Doornail. She owns a casino called "Siete Velos" and is the maker of a vampire called Mickey.

 Selah Pumfrey
Following his broken relationship with Sookie, Bill briefly dated a real estate agent named Selah Pumfrey. Bill makes it obvious that he still carries a torch for Sookie and continues to try to be involved in her life.

 Judith Vardamon
Bill's "sister," who looks like his former human wife, was turned by Lorena Ball in an attempt to placate Bill after he was caught staring fondly at Judith.  Reunited only recently by Sookie's interference in Dead In The Family in order to save him from silver-poisoning, Judith and Bill's affair only lasted one book, as she has recently left Bon Temps in "Dead Reckoning."  Not knowing Judith was standing within earshot in the treeline behind Sookie's house, Bill tells Sookie that Judith is obsessed with him and although he had hoped to return her love he does not. Judith reacts by leaving town.

 Caroline Compton
Bill's wife and the mother of his two children.

Television portrayal

In True Blood, an HBO series based on the books, this character is played by Stephen Moyer, and first appeared in the BloodCopy.com video “Bon Temps Vampire speaks”, The storyline of Bill differs significantly from that in the novels. In season one, as a punishment for staking a vampire, Bill is forced to turn a teenage girl named Jessica Hamby into a vampire, thus creating his first and only progeny in the series. 

In season 3, Bill has his maker, Lorena, staked by Sookie. In desperate need of blood, Sookie slits her arm to feed him. However, he quickly overpowers her and nearly drains her to death before realizing his actions. After being kicked out into the sunlight by an enraged Tara, he learns that faerie blood temporarily makes vampires immune to the sun. 

In season 4, Bill is named the vampire king of Louisiana after staging a coup d'état against Queen Sophie Anne with the help of the Authority. 

In season 5, he and Eric Northman are arrested for the murder of Nan Flanigan. The two are brought to the Authority's underground base, where he eventually accepts the Book of Lilith. Bill is left competing with Salome for the vial of Lilith's blood, which he eventually wins by killing her. After drinking Lilith's blood, despite Eric and Sookie trying to convince him not to, Bill begins to bleed out and dies. Moments later, however, he is resurrected as a more powerful vampire, now having the strength of Lilith as well. 

While the extent of his new powers are not fully understood, it has been revealed in season 6 that he is impervious to staking, he no longer needs an invitation to enter a human home, and that he involuntarily has visions of the future. He is also able to command Warlow, Lilith's only known progeny and Sookie's love interest. After drinking Warlow's blood, Bill is able to walk in the sun. Using this power, he is able to kill Governor Truman Burrell and his guards in an effort to save Jessica. 

By the end of the series in Season 7, Bill has been infected with the Hep V virus. Instead of taking a cure, he is resigned to die, and eventually convinces Sookie to stake him as he lies in his Civil War grave, giving him the "true death".

References 

Fictional vampires
Fictional characters with superhuman durability or invulnerability
Fictional characters with superhuman strength
Fictional characters who can move at superhuman speeds
Fictional characters with accelerated healing
Fictional characters from Louisiana
Fictional soldiers
Fictional American Civil War veterans
Literary characters introduced in 2001
Male characters in literature
Male characters in television
The Southern Vampire Mysteries characters